Kendrick L. Bourne (born August 4, 1995) is an American football wide receiver for the New England Patriots of the National Football League (NFL). He played college football at Eastern Washington. He also played for the San Francisco 49ers.

College career
Bourne attended and played college football at Eastern Washington and contributed from 2013 to 2016. He was a respected receiver for EWU.

Collegiate statistics

Professional career

San Francisco 49ers
On April 30, 2017, the San Francisco 49ers signed Bourne to a three-year, US$1.67 million contract as an undrafted free agent. The contract included $25,000 guaranteed and a signing bonus of $5,000.

2017 season
Throughout training camp, Bourne competed for a roster spot as a backup wide receiver against Aldrick Robinson, Bruce Ellington, DeAndre Smelter, Aaron Burbridge, DeAndre Carter, B. J. Johnson, and Victor Bolden Jr. Head coach Kyle Shanahan named Bourne the fifth wide receiver on the depth chart to begin the regular season, behind Marquise Goodwin, Pierre Garçon, Aldrick Robinson, and Trent Taylor.

He made his professional regular season debut during the San Francisco 49ers’ season-opening 23–3 loss against the Carolina Panthers. Bourne was inactive as a healthy scratch for the next five games (Weeks 2–6). On November 5, 2017, Bourne caught two passes for 39-yards during a 20–10 loss against the Arizona Cardinals. Bourne made his first career reception on a 25-yard pass by C. J. Beathard during the third quarter against the Cardinals. In Week 14, Bourne had a season-high four receptions for 85 receiving yards as the 49ers defeated the Tennessee Titans 25–23. He appeared in 11 games without a start during his rookie campaign and finished  16 receptions for 257 receiving yards. Head coach Kyle Shanahan praised Bourne's improvement over his rookie year.

2018 season
Bourne entered camp as a backup wide receiver. Head coach Kyle Shanahan named him the fifth wide receiver on the depth chart to start the 2018 NFL season, behind Pierre Garçon, Marquise Goodwin, Trent Taylor, and Dante Pettis.

On September 16, 2018, Bourne caught his first career touchdown reception on a four-yard pass by quarterback Jimmy Garoppolo during a 30–27 victory against the  Detroit Lions. On October 28, 2018, Bourne made his first career start after Pierre Garçon aggravated a knee injury. Bourne finished the 49ers’ 18–15 loss at the Arizona Cardinals in Week 8 with a season-high seven catches for 71-yards. In Week 15, he caught four passes for a season-high 73 receiving yards as the 49ers lost 14–9 against the Chicago Bears. Bourne finished the 2018 NFL season with 42 receptions for 487 yards and four touchdowns. He led all of the San Francisco 49ers’ wide receivers in receiving yards and receptions.

2019 season

In the 2019 season, Bourne had 30 receptions for 358 receiving yards and five receiving touchdowns. Bourne tied with George Kittle for the most touchdown receptions on the team with five. The 49ers finished with a 13–3 record and earned the #1-seed for the NFC Playoffs. In the Divisional Round against the Minnesota Vikings, he had three receptions for 40 receiving yards and one receiving touchdown in the 27–10 victory. He had a quiet day with a single reception for six yards in the 37–20 victory over the Green Bay Packers in the NFC Championship. The 49ers reached Super Bowl LIV, but they lost 31–20 to the Kansas City Chiefs. Bourne had two receptions for 42 receiving yards in the game.

2020 season
On April 6, 2020, Bourne was re-signed to a one-year, $3.259 million contract. He was placed on the reserve/COVID-19 list by the team on November 4, 2020, and activated two days later. He was placed back on the list on November 9, and activated again on November 13.

New England Patriots
On March 19, 2021, Bourne signed a three-year, $15 million contract with the New England Patriots.

During Week 6 against the Dallas Cowboys, Bourne had a 75-yard touchdown on his only reception of the game, as the Patriots lost 35–29 in overtime. In Week 7 against the New York Jets, Bourne threw his first career touchdown pass, a 25 yarder to receiver Nelson Agholor. He also had 4 receptions for 68 yard in the game, as the Patriots won 54–13. In a Week 10 45–7 win against the Cleveland Browns, Bourne had 4 receptions for 98 yards and a touchdown; the 98 yards were a career high in a game for Bourne. In Week 12 against the Tennessee Titans, Bourne had five receptions for 61 yards and two touchdowns, including a 41 yarder, and helped the Patriots win 36-13, the team's sixth straight victory. He finished the season with a career-high 55 catches for 800 yards and five touchdowns.

Bourne entered the 2022 season third on the Patriots depth chart. He finished the season fourth on the team with 35 catches for 434 yards and one touchdown.

NFL career statistics

Regular season

Postseason

References

External links
Eastern Washington Eagles bio
San Francisco 49ers bio

1995 births
Living people
Players of American football from Portland, Oregon
American sportspeople of Samoan descent
African-American players of American football
American football wide receivers
Eastern Washington Eagles football players
San Francisco 49ers players
New England Patriots players
21st-century African-American sportspeople